KPAY (1290 AM) is a sports formatted radio station in Northern California. The station can be heard in Butte County, California, and parts of Tehama County, Glenn County, and Colusa County. The station's transmitter power is 5,000 watts and is located in Chico, California. The station is owned by Deer Creek Broadcasting, LLC. KPAY is a radio affiliate of Fox Sports Radio, also covering north valley sports, including Chico State Wildcat Athletics (baseball, basketball), the NFL, MLB, Warriors, Oakland A's and Butte Community College Football.

History
In October 1949, KXOC-AM began broadcasting. In February 1953, KXOC-AM changed its call sign to KPAY-AM. In July 1994, the KPAY building was destroyed by fire.  The station was originally located on 1060 kHz, but moved to 1290 kHz, which had been vacated by KHSL-AM after KHSL moved its format to the FM band at 103.5, now known as "The Blaze". In July 2019, Portland, Oregon-based Bustos Media was involved in a multi-station trade. 1290 AM was transitioned from news talk radio to sports provided by Fox Sports Radio. The original news and talk show content was moved to 93.9 FM.

Notable personalities and shows
Dan Patrick
Colin Cowherd
Doug Gottlieb
Damon Amendolara
Mike Baca  (program director)

See also
 KHSL (FM)

Previous logo
 (KPAY's logo under previous news/talk format)

References

External links
KPAY official website
FCC History Cards for KPAY
FCC History Cards for KPAY (1060 kHz)

PAY
Sports radio stations in the United States
Butte County, California